"Limbo" is a song by English singer Bryan Ferry, the former lead vocalist for Roxy Music. It was released as the third and final single from his seventh album Bête Noire in 1988, and was his twenty-seventh single. The song failed to enjoy as much success as the two previous singles from the album; it peaked at No. 86 on the UK Singles Chart. It also appears in the ill-fated film Big Time, starring Paul Guilfoyle.

The song, like the other singles released from the album ("The Right Stuff" and "Kiss and Tell"), features The Smiths' lead guitarist Johnny Marr.

The promotional video for the song was directed by style and fashion guru Michael Roberts, a longtime friend of Ferry. One of the models is Regina Monte.

Compilation appearances
As well as the song's album and single releases, it has been featured on various Ferry compilation albums, including The Platinum Collection, Collection and The Best of Bryan Ferry.

Chart performance

References

External links
 

1988 singles
Bryan Ferry songs
Songs written by Bryan Ferry
Songs written by Patrick Leonard
1987 songs